"Hi Summer" is a song written by Lynsey de Paul and recorded by Carl Wayne as a single released on the DJM/Weekend label on 5 August 1977. The B-side of the single is another song composed by de Paul, "My Girl and Me". Both songs were produced by de Paul with "Hi Summer" being published by Standard Music. It was used as the theme tune to the popular Sunday night prime time ITV variety programme Hi Summer, which also featured Carl Wayne as one of the performers. The song received good reviews, with notable British DJ and music critic James Hamilton writing "Ultra-brite and bouncy TV theme really does get ‘em jiving" for his weekly disco music feature in Record Mirror. That issue of Record Mirror also contained a half page advert for the single. Music Week also featured a full page advert for the single. College DJ Andy Davids promoted an uptempo television theme playlist at the time, that included "Hi Summer" along with the theme tunes from "Happy Days" by Pratt & McClain as well as the Muppet Show.

Although it did not reach the UK Singles Chart, in part due to lack of BBC radio play, it peaked at number 4 on the official Rhodesian singles chart, having been released on the Gallo label and made number 10 in the South African chart, having been released on DJM Records. It is also mentioned in the book La saga de Roy Wood Brumbeat forever by Vincent Lasserre, as is "My Girl and Me".

Later, the song was also used to advertise ITV's weekly magazine TVTimes and its affiliated regional commercial television channels,. "Hi Summer" was also included as an album track on the 1977 compilation album, T.V. Themes, released on the DJM/Weekend Records label. It receives occasional radio airplay in the U.S.

References

Songs written by Lynsey de Paul
Music television series theme songs
1977 singles